Arsène "Kagamé" Mutomb Mbav (born 8 August 1987) is a Congolese basketball player, who plays for Espoir Fukash of the Liprobakin and the DR Congo national basketball team.

Professional career
In August 2019, Mutomb Mbav signed with CB Cazorla in the Spanish Liga EBA.

In the 2020–21 season, Mutomb Mbav played for Tunisian club AS Hammamet in the Championnat National A.

National team career
Mutombe Mbav was a member of the DR Congo national basketball team, and helped the team win the gold medal at FIBA AfroCan 2019, contributing 5 points and 5.3 rebounds per game. He also played at FIBA AfroBasket 2021 for his country.

References

External links
RealGM profile

1987 births
Living people
Democratic Republic of the Congo men's basketball players
Centers (basketball)
ASB Mazembe players
AS Hammamet players
BC Espoir Fukash players